Kelly Thompson Jr. (born 1947/1948) is an American lawyer from Kentucky who has served as a justice of the Kentucky Supreme Court since 2023. He was previously a judge of the Kentucky Court of Appeals from 2007 to 2023.

Education 

Thompson graduated from Western Kentucky University in 1968 with a Bachelor of Arts and a teaching certificate. He earned a Juris Doctor from the University of Kentucky College of Law in 1972.

Career 

After graduating law school, from 1972 to 1973 he was chief trial counsel for the Kentucky Department of Highways in Hardin County and from 1973 to 1974, he served as a law clerk for the Kentucky Court of Appeals. From 1974 to 2006 he was a lawyer in the Bowling Green area. He was elected to the Kentucky Court of Appeals in 2006.

Kentucky Supreme Court 

On November 8, 2022, Thompson was elected as a justice of the Kentucky Supreme Court, defeating his challenger, healthcare lawyer Shawn Marie Alcott. He replaced retiring Chief Justice John D. Minton Jr.

Electoral history

References

External links 

1940s births
Living people
Year of birth missing (living people)
Place of birth missing (living people)
20th-century American lawyers
21st-century American judges
21st-century American lawyers
Judges of the Kentucky Court of Appeals
Justices of the Kentucky Supreme Court
Kentucky lawyers
University of Kentucky College of Law alumni
Western Kentucky University alumni